Castell's sign is a medical sign assessed to evaluate splenomegaly and typically part of an abdominal examination.  It is an alternative physical examination maneuver to percussion over Traube's space.

Splenomegaly, although associated with numerous diseases, remains one of the more elusive physical exam findings in the abdomen.  Conditions such as infectious mononucleosis, thalassemia, and cirrhotic liver disease may all involve splenomegaly and as a result, the search for a reliable sign associated with this condition has been sought for generations.  Currently, several such signs of splenomegaly exist, all of whose utility has been debated in medical literature.  The presence or absence of splenomegaly, however, can be reliably appreciated on physical exam using Castell's sign in conjunction with other clinical information, increasing the positive predictive value of the test.  When used in a decision-making rubric, Castell's sign becomes a valuable part of deciding whether to pursue further imaging.

Technique
Castell's method involves first placing the patient in the supine position.  With the patient in full inspiration and then full expiration, percuss the area of the lowest intercostal space (eighth or ninth) in the left anterior axillary line.  If the note changes from resonant on full expiration to dull on full inspiration, the sign is regarded as positive.  The resonant note heard upon full expiration is likely to be due to the air-filled stomach or splenic flexure of the colon.  When the patient inspires, the spleen moves inferiorly along the posterolateral abdominal wall.  If the spleen is enlarged enough that the inferior pole reaches the eighth or ninth intercostal space, a dull percussion note will be appreciated, indicating splenomegaly.

Some limitations, however, were also reported by Castell in his original paper.  First the presence of gross splenomegaly or profuse fluid in the stomach or colon may lead to the absence of a resonant percussion note on full expiration.  Also, later articles have criticized the maneuver's reliability as befalling to more obese individuals and the amount of time the patient is post-prandial.

Interpretation
The 1993 systematic review by the Rational Clinical Examination found that Castell's sign was the most sensitive physical examination maneuver for detecting splenomegaly when comparing palpation, Nixon's sign (another percussion sign), and Traube's space percussion:
 sensitivity = 82%
 specificity = 83%

In asymptomatic patients where there is a very low clinical suspicion for splenomegaly, physical examination alone is unlikely to rule-in splenomegaly due to the inadequate sensitivity of the examination.  Similar to many other findings in medicine, Castell's sign must be combined with clinical findings to rule in splenomegaly.   To achieve a positive predictive value over 90%, the pretest probability must be 70%. Grover et al., recommends a greater than 10% preexamination clinical suspicion of splenic enlargement to effectively rule in the diagnosis of splenomegaly with physical exam.  However, a 10% pretest probability only yields a positive predictive value of 35%.

To rule out an enlarged spleen, a pretest probability of 30% or less will yield a negative predictive value over 90% (calculation)

Given the paucity of physical exam findings to evaluate possible splenomegaly, Castell's sign is the most sensitive, and is thus a good tool to teach in an advanced-type physical diagnosis course.  Castell's has been shown to be superior in sensitivity to other spleen percussion signs as well as palpation, which is not likely useful due to the extreme enlargement necessary to feel the spleen below the costal margin.  Castell's sign is thus, in the appropriate clinical scenario, an important part of the abdominal physical exam.

History
Donald O. Castell first described his sign in the 1967 paper, “The Spleen Percussion Sign” published in Annals of Internal Medicine. Castell, a George Washington Medical School graduate, is also a Navy-trained gastroenterologist.  While stationed at the Great Lakes naval base in northern Illinois, Castell studied 20 male patients, 10 of whom had a positive percussion [Castell's] sign and 10 patient controls with negative percussion signs.  The spleen of each patient was then quantitatively measured using chromium-labeled erythrocytes and radioisotope photoscan of the spleen.  Castell showed those patients in the control group had a mean spleen size of 75 cm2 with a range of 57 cm2 to 75 cm2, while those who had a positive percussion sign had a mean spleen size of 93 cm2 with a range of 77 cm2 to 120 cm2. Castell concluded that his technique of spleen percussion was thus useful in identifying “slight to moderate degrees of splenic enlargement”  and, as a result, constituted a “valuable diagnostic technique.”

References

Physical examination
Symptoms and signs: Digestive system and abdomen